Act! may refer to:

Act! CRM, a customer relationship management software 
ACT! for America, a United States-based anti-Muslim group
Act! (Italy), an Italian political party